Pindi Bhattian, is a tehsil or an administrative sub-division of Hafizabad district located on the left bank of Chenab River. Pindi Bhattian is its capital city and administration unit.

Notable people 

 Mian Intisar Hussain Bhatti (Ex Member of Provincial Assembly)
 Mian Ahsan Ansar Bhatti (Member of Provincial Assembly)

Government 
Tehsil Pindi Bhattian is governed by the Hafiz Abad district and consists of 17 union councils.

References 

Populated places in Hafizabad District
Tehsils of Punjab, Pakistan